Mnemesis is the fifth and final studio album by Danish metal band Mnemic. It is the first album to feature members Simone Bertozzi, Victor-Ray Salomonsen, and Brian Larsen and the last album to feature their lead singer at the time Guillaume Bideau who had passed away in 2022 due to as of yet unknown reasons.

History 
In April 2011, longtime bass player Tomas "Obeast" Koefoed announced his departure from the band, stating that his ambitions weren't fulfilled with the band. Later that year, original members drummer Brian "Brylle" Rasmussen and guitarist Rune Stigart also left the group. In October, former members were officially replaced, respectively, by Italian bassist Simone Bertozzi and Danish Tour members drummer Brian Larsen, and guitarist Victor-Ray Salomonsen.

In March 2012, Mnemic announced that their new album would be called Mnemesis, and would be produced by producer Tue Madsen. The artwork for the album was created by Metastazis. In April, the band announced the track list and that the album was set to release on June 8. In May, Mnemic toured Europe, alongside Raunchy, to promote Mnemesis.

On 3 May 2012, the band released the first single from the album called "I've Been You" on SoundCloud.

In the first week Mnemesis sold 800 copies in the United States only, landing at position No. 38 on the Heatseekers Album chart.

On 18 September 2012, a music video for the single "I've Been You" was released.

Track listing 
All music written by Mnemic.

Personnel 
 Guillaume Bideau – vocals
 Mircea Gabriel Eftemie – guitar
 Victor-Ray Salomonsen – guitar, keyboards, programming, lead guitar on "There's No Tomorrow" and "Empty Planet"
 Simone Bertozzi – bass
 Brian Larsen – drums
Production
 Tue Madsen – producer, guitar solo on "A Matter of Choice"
 Metastazis – artwork

References 

2012 albums
Mnemic albums
Nuclear Blast albums
Albums produced by Tue Madsen